Beaver Bridge may refer to:

 Beaver Bridge (Ohio River), a rail bridge between Monaca and Beaver, Pennsylvania, U.S.
 Beaver Bridge (Arkansas), a historic road bridge in Beaver, Arkansas, U.S.
 Beaver Covered Bridge, or North Oriental Covered Bridge, in Perry Township, Snyder County, Pennsylvania, U.S.
 Beaver River Bridge, across the Beaver River in North Sewickley Township, Beaver County, Pennsylvania, U.S.
 Beaver River Railroad Bridge, across the Beaver River in New Brighton, Pennsylvania, U.S.
 Rochester-Beaver Railroad Bridge, across the Beaver River between Rochester and Bridgewater, Pennsylvania, U.S.

See also
Beaver Creek Bridge (disambiguation)
 Beaver Dam Bridge, near Murdochville, Quebec, Canada, that collapsed in 1963
 Beaver Dam Bridge, or Van Sant Covered Bridge, in Solebury Township, near New Hope in Bucks County, Pennsylvania, U.S.